Korea Communications Commission is a South Korean media regulation agency modeled after the Federal Communications Commission of the United States of America. It was established on February 29, 2008, combining the former Korean Broadcasting Commission and the Ministry of Information and Communication. The five members of the Commissioners make a decision. The current Chairman, among the five Commissioners, is Han Sang-hyuk.

Comprehensive programming
The KCC approved four newspapers companies, Chojoongdong (Chosun Ilbo, Joongang Ilbo, and Donga Ilbo) media cartel and Maeil Economics, to engage in the comprehensive programming for television channels on December 31, 2010. This has given more financial and political power to the right-wing conservative media groups in South Korea. Even before KCC's approval, this had generated concerns about the potential politically biased journalistic movement akin to the United States of America's Fox News. The KCC-approved comprehensive programming could potentially destroy the fair media practices starting in 2012 when the new television channels affect the domestic journalist scene.

The Comprehensive Programming channel were criticized for the lack of quality programs. They were also criticized for opening the television channels on December 1, 2011, when there were a growing outrage against Lee Myung-bak in the general public. The negative factors later made a negative first impression of the new TV channels.

The second day TV Chosun by Chosun Ilbo on December 2, 2011, was met with numerous criticisms on politically biased news captions, criticizing the remarks on the female novelist, Gong Ji-young, and reception issues that split the televised screen into two.

The first day of TV Chosun showed Kang Ho Dong on a negative light.

Frequency
The KCC had suggested a unified mobile frequency interface with Japan's.

Controversies
On December 21, 2010, the KCC controversially announced that it is planning to create a guideline about monitoring the internet content in case of a tense political situation; automatically deleting any online anti-governmental message that could lead to internet censorship.
Fitch Ratings negatively commented about the KCC's decision to allow tariff discounts for the South Korean telecommunication companies.
KCC was not able to properly fine Apple Inc. for its illegal collection of GPS location data of Korean iPhone users.

See also
Korean Central Broadcasting Committee
Censorship in South Korea
Korea Communications Standards Commission
Korea Communication Commission English language website

References

External links
  Korea Communications Commission

Government agencies of South Korea
2008 establishments in South Korea
Government agencies established in 2008
Broadcasting in South Korea
Lee Myung-bak Government
Mass media regulation
Regulation in South Korea
Telecommunications regulatory authorities